AKTIVA ENGINEERING is a leading Macedonian steel construction company in the metal industry and is one of the construction companies in the business, encompassing services for the design, supervision and construction of all types of buildings. AKTIVA Engineering was founded in 1999. In North Macedonia, AKTIVA has installed the first photovoltaic panels to generate electricity from the energy of the sun.

References

Companies of North Macedonia
Construction and civil engineering companies established in 1999
Brands of North Macedonia
Macedonian companies established in 1999